Austrocidaris pawsoni is a species of sea urchins of the Family Cidaridae. Their armour is covered with spines. Austrocidaris pawsoni was first scientifically described in 1974 by McKnight.

References

Animals described in 1974
Cidaridae